The 2008 Copa Colsanitas was a women's tennis tournament played on outdoor clay courts. It was the 11th edition of the Copa Colsanitas, and was part of the Tier III Series of the 2008 WTA Tour. It took place at the Club Campestre El Rancho in Bogotá, Colombia, from 18 February through 24 February 2008. Qualifier Nuria Llagostera Vives won the singles title and earned $29,000 first-prize money.

Finals

Singles

 Nuria Llagostera Vives defeated  María Emilia Salerni, 6–0, 6–4
 It was Nuria Llagostera Vives' 1st title of the year, and her 2nd overall.

Doubles

 Iveta Benešová /  Bethanie Mattek defeated  Jelena Kostanić Tošić /  Martina Müller, 6–3, 6–3

External links
 Official website
 ITF tournament edition details
 Tournament draws

Copa Colsanitas
Copa Colsanitas
2008 in Colombian tennis